Fredric Steinkamp (August 22, 1928 – February 20, 2002) was an American film editor with more than 40 film credits. He had a longstanding, notable collaboration with director Sydney Pollack, editing nearly all of Pollack's films from They Shoot Horses, Don't They? (1969) through Sabrina (1995).

Steinkamp began his career working part-time in the sound department of the MGM Studios. He became an assistant editor at MGM, and worked for Adrienne Fazan, Ralph E. Winters, Jack Dunning, and Harold F. Kress. Kress recommended Steinkamp as the editor for The Adventures of Huckleberry Finn (directed by Michael Curtiz, 1960), which was Steinkamp's first editing credit. From 1980 on, Steinkamp co-edited most films with his son, William Steinkamp; after 1995, William Steinkamp became Sydney Pollack's principal editor through the end of the latter's career in 2005.

Steinkamp won the Academy Award for Best Film Editing for Grand Prix (directed by John Frankenheimer, 1966). He was nominated for the Academy Award for editing four films directed by Pollack: They Shoot Horses, Don't They? (1969), Three Days of the Condor (1975), Tootsie (1982), and Out of Africa (1985). All of these films had co-editors, including his son William Steinkamp for the last two. He was nominated for the BAFTA Award for Best Editing for They Shoot Horses, Don't They? (1969). He was nominated for ACE Eddie awards for editing The Unsinkable Molly Brown (directed by Charles Walters - 1964), Grand Prix (1966), Tootsie (1982), and Out of Africa (1985).

In 2001 Steinkamp received the Career Achievement Award of the American Cinema Editors (ACE).

See also
List of film director and editor collaborations

References

External links

Best Film Editing Academy Award winners
1928 births
2002 deaths
American film editors